Tripudia luxuriosa is a moth in the family Noctuidae (the owlet moths) first described by Smith in 1900. It is found in North America.

The MONA or Hodges number for Tripudia luxuriosa is 9008.

References

Further reading

External links
 

Eustrotiinae
Articles created by Qbugbot
Moths described in 1900